Dong Zhaozhi (born 16 November 1973 in Guangzhou, Guangdong) is a left handed male Chinese foil fencer. He competed in the 1996 Summer Olympics, the 2000 Summer Olympics, and the 2004 Summer Olympics.

In 1996, he was eliminated in the first round of the Olympic foil tournament and finished ninth with the Chinese foil team in the team event.

Four years later, he won the silver medal as part of the Chinese foil team. In the 2000 Olympic foil tournament he was eliminated in the first round again.

In 2004, he won the silver medal again as a member of the Chinese foil team. In the individual Olympic foil tournament he was eliminated in the first round again. Since then, he lives in Guangzhou with his daughter and wife, and has not competed again.

References

1973 births
Living people
Chinese male foil fencers
Fencers at the 1996 Summer Olympics
Fencers at the 2000 Summer Olympics
Fencers at the 2004 Summer Olympics
Olympic fencers of China
Olympic silver medalists for China
Olympic medalists in fencing
Medalists at the 2000 Summer Olympics
Medalists at the 2004 Summer Olympics
Asian Games medalists in fencing
Fencers at the 1994 Asian Games
Fencers at the 1998 Asian Games
Asian Games gold medalists for China
Asian Games silver medalists for China
Asian Games bronze medalists for China
Medalists at the 1994 Asian Games
Medalists at the 1998 Asian Games
Universiade medalists in fencing
Fencers from Guangzhou
Universiade gold medalists for China
Medalists at the 2001 Summer Universiade
20th-century Chinese people
21st-century Chinese people